NCIS and its characters were originally introduced in a two-part episode of the CBS television series JAG in .

Created by Donald P. Bellisario and Don McGill, and executive produced by Bellisario, Shane Brennan, Gary Glasberg, and George Schenck & Frank Cardea, NCIS stars Mark Harmon as Supervisory Special Agent Leroy Jethro Gibbs, and Gary Cole as Supervisory Special Agent Alden Parker in charge of NCIS' Major Case Response Team. Based out of Washington, D.C., the team includes special agents Caitlin Todd (Sasha Alexander), Anthony DiNozzo (Michael Weatherly), Timothy McGee (Sean Murray), Ziva David (Cote de Pablo),  Eleanor Bishop (Emily Wickersham), Alexandra Quinn (Jennifer Esposito), Nicholas Torres (Wilmer Valderrama), and Jessica Knight (Katrina Law), forensic specialists Abby Sciuto (Pauley Perrette) and Kasie Hines (Diona Reasonover), medical examiners Jimmy Palmer (Brian Dietzen) and Donald "Ducky" Mallard (David McCallum), medical examiners assistant Gerald Jackson (Pancho Demmings) and SIS attaché Clayton Reeves (Duane Henry). Operational psychologist Dr. Jacqueline Sloane (Maria Bello) assists the team during troubled times, while successive Directors Tom Morrow (Alan Dale), Jennifer Shepard (Lauren Holly), and Leon Vance (Rocky Carroll) command from on high.

Series overview

Episodes

Introductory episodes
The program and its characters are introduced during the eighth season of JAG. The JAG episodes, "Ice Queen" and "Meltdown", served as pilot episodes for the show. The character Special Agent Vivian Blackadder (Robyn Lively) does not appear in the series because producer Donald Bellisario felt that "she was a little soft for this kind of role". In , the two episodes were edited together and aired as "Navy NCIS: The Beginning".

Season 1 (2003–04)

 Sean Murray (Timothy McGee) had a continuous arc starting with the seventh episode ("Sub Rosa").

Season 2 (2004–05)

 Sean Murray (Timothy McGee) was promoted to the main cast starting with the episode "See No Evil".
 Sasha Alexander (Special Agent Caitlin Todd) left the show after the season finale ("Twilight").

Season 3 (2005–06)

 Cote de Pablo (Ziva David) had a continuous arc starting with the first two episodes ("Kill Ari"), and later promoted to the main cast in the episode "Silver War".
 Lauren Holly joins the supporting cast as NCIS Director Jenny Shepard. She was promoted to the main cast in the ninth episode ("Frame Up").
 This is the first season to feature 24 episodes.

Season 4 (2006–07)

Season 5 (2007–08)

 Rocky Carroll (Leon Vance) had a continuous arc starting with episode 14 ("Internal Affairs").
 Lauren Holly (Jenny Shepard) left the show after the season finale ("Judgment Day").

Season 6 (2008–09)

 Rocky Carroll (Leon Vance) was promoted to the main cast starting with the episode "Last Man Standing".
 "Legend" serves as the two-part backdoor pilot for the spin-off NCIS: Los Angeles.

Season 7 (2009–10)

Season 8 (2010–11)

Season 9 (2011–12)

Season 10 (2012–13)

 Brian Dietzen as M.E. Assistant (Jimmy Palmer) was promoted to the main cast as of this season.

Season 11 (2013–14)

 Cote de Pablo as Special Agent (Ziva David) departed the show after the second episode, "Past, Present, and Future".
 Emily Wickersham as NSA Analyst and then Probationary Special Agent, (Eleanor Bishop), is introduced in episode nine, "Gut Check", and was later promoted to the main cast in episode twelve, "Kill Chain".
 "Crescent City" serves as the two-part pilot for NCIS: New Orleans.

Season 12 (2014–15)

Season 13 (2015–16)

 Episode 12 begins a crossover event that concludes on NCIS: New Orleans season 2 episode 12.
 Michael Weatherly (Anthony DiNozzo) departed the series after the season finale "Family First".

Season 14 (2016–17)

 Jennifer Esposito (Alexandra "Alex" Quinn) and Wilmer Valderrama (Nicholas "Nick" Torres) join the cast. Jennifer Esposito departed in the season finale.
 Duane Henry (MI6 Senior Officer Clayton Reeves) was promoted to the main cast in the fifth episode ("Philly").
 Episode 15 begins a crossover event that concludes in NCIS: New Orleans season 3 episode 14.

Season 15 (2017–18)

 Maria Bello (Jacqueline Sloane) made her series debut in episode 4, "Skeleton Crew", before her promotion to series regular in episode 5, "Fake It 'Til You Make It".
 Pauley Perrette (Abby Sciuto) and Duane Henry (Clayton Reeves) departed the show in episode 22, "Two Steps Back".

Season 16 (2018–19)

 Diona Reasonover (Kasie Hines) was promoted to the main cast.
 Cote de Pablo (Ziva David) made a surprise appearance in the season finale.

Season 17 (2019–20)

 Cote de Pablo (Ziva David) had a recurring role in the season.
 On March 13, 2020, CBS announced that the filming of season 17 had been suspended due to the COVID-19 pandemic resulting in only 20 episodes being filmed.

Season 18 (2020–21)

Maria Bello (Jacqueline Sloane) departed the show in episode 8 "True Believer".
Emily Wickersham (Eleanor Bishop) departed the show after the season finale "Rule 91".

Season 19 (2021–22)

Katrina Law (Jessica Knight) was promoted to the main cast.
Gary Cole (Alden Parker) makes his debut in episode 2 and joins the main cast in episode 3.
Mark Harmon (Leroy Jethro Gibbs) departed the show in episode 4 "Great Wide Open", but remains on the title sequence for the remainder of the season, but was removed in season 20.
Episode 17 begins a crossover event that concludes on NCIS: Hawaiʻi season 1 episode 18.

Season 20 (2022–23)

 Episode 1 begins a crossover event that concludes on NCIS: Hawaiʻi season 2 episode 1.
 Episode 10 begins a crossover event that continues on NCIS: Hawaiʻi season 2 episode 10 and concludes on NCIS: Los Angeles season 14 episode 10.

Home media

References
 General references that apply to most episodes

External links
 

NCIS
NCIS